Lucy Meacock is an English journalist and presenter employed by ITV Granada. She has been one of the main female news presenters of ITV regional news programme, Granada Reports since 1988 and celebrated 30 years presenting the programme in November 2018 at age 59.

Early life and education
Lucy Meacock moved to Chester when she was six. She was educated at the independent school, Ursuline Convent, in Chester. She then moved to Australia, where she attended the independent Morongo Girls College in Geelong, Victoria. After returning to the United Kingdom, she attended the independent Upper Chine School in Shanklin on the Isle of Wight.

Broadcasting career
Meacock started her career at the Chester Chronicle. She went on to work with BBC Radio Newcastle, ITV News Tyne Tees on ITV Tyne Tees and London Plus on BBC South East in the 1980s. She then worked for ITV News Anglia on ITV Anglia.

Meacock has been the lead female presenter for Granada Reports on ITV Granada since 1988, where she has won two BAFTA TV Awards; one for coverage of the Hillsborough disaster.

In the 1990s, she appeared as a Guest Presenter on This Morning.

On 31 March 2006, Meacock interviewed the then United States Secretary of State, Condoleezza Rice on Granada Reports. Meacock currently presents Granada Reports from Monday to Thursday and presents two lunchtime (Wednesday/Thursday) and two late (Monday/Tuesday) bulletins per week.

She has also chaired the ITV Granada late night discussion programme The Late Debate, as well as co-presenting Granada Upfront, a live regional debate programme with Tony Wilson.

In 2001, Meacock won two Royal Television Society awards for the Manchester Bomb Programme and the Organ Retention Scandal Debate.

In 2007, she joined ITN covering various ITV News programmes until August 2009, she returned in July 2011 until 2015.

In November 2009, Meacock was awarded an honorary degree by the University of Central Lancashire.

Additionally, she hosts various business awards and conferences. She also mentors new broadcasters, actors & public speakers.

Her charity work has involved climbing Snowdon, cycling from Manchester to Chester and from Chester to Liverpool. It has also involved sleeping out for the homeless and abseiling down Liverpool's Radio City Tower.

On 3 August 2020, Meacock presented a special edition of Granada Reports following the death of her co-presenter of 17 years, Tony Morris.

On 16 June 2022, Meacock was installed as Chancellor of the University of Salford.

In popular culture

St Helens based comedy folk band the Lancashire Hotpots included a song about Meacock on their fifth album Achtung Gravy.

References

External links

1959 births
English reporters and correspondents
English journalists
English television presenters
ITN newsreaders and journalists
ITV regional newsreaders and journalists
Living people
People from Chester
People educated at Ryde School with Upper Chine